|}
{| class="collapsible collapsed" cellpadding="0" cellspacing="0" style="clear:right; float:right; text-align:center; font-weight:bold;" width="280px"
! colspan="3" style="border:1px solid black; background-color: #77DD77;" | Also Ran

The 1985 Epsom Derby (known as the Ever Ready Derby for sponsorship reasons) was the 206th annual running of the Derby horse race. It took place at Epsom Downs Racecourse on 5 June 1985.

The race was won by Lord Howard de Walden's Slip Anchor, at odds of 9/4 ridden by jockey Steve Cauthen and trained at Newmarket by Henry Cecil. The win was a first success in the race for owner, trainer and jockey. Cauthen became the first man to ride the winners of both the Kentucky Derby and the Epsom Derby.

Race details
 Sponsor: Ever Ready
 Winner's prize money: £204,160
 Going: Good
 Number of runners: 14
 Winner's time: 2 minutes, 36.23 seconds

Full result

Winner details
Further details of the winner, Slip Anchor:

 Foaled: 15 April 1982, in United Kingdom
 Sire: Shirley Heights; Dam: Sayonara (Birkhahn)
 Owner: Lord Howard de Walden
 Breeder: Lord Howard de Walden

Form analysis

Two-year-old races
Notable runs by the future Derby participants as two-year-olds in 1984:
 Damister – 1st in Somerville Tattersall Stakes, 2nd in William Hill Futurity
 Lanfranco – 1st in William Hill Futurity
 Law Society – 1st in Anglesey Stakes, 1st in National Stakes, 2nd in Dewhurst Stakes
 Petoski – 1st in Lanson Champagne Stakes, 3rd in Champagne Stakes
 Reach – 1st in Royal Lodge Stakes
 Royal Harmony – 2nd in Acomb Stakes, 3rd in Royal Lodge Stakes

The road to Epsom
Early-season appearances in 1985 and trial races prior to running in the Derby:
 Damister – 2nd in Craven Stakes, 1st in Sandown Classic Trial, 1st in Dante Stakes
 Lanfranco – 1st in Predominate Stakes
 Law Society – 1st in Chester Vase
 Petoski – 2nd in Sandown Classic Trial, 2nd in Chester Vase
 Phardante – 2nd in Predominate Stakes
 Reach – 3rd in Dante Stakes
 Seurat – 1st in Prix Jean de Chaudenay
 Shadeed – 1st in Craven Stakes, 1st in 2,000 Guineas Stakes
 Slip Anchor – 1st in Heathorn Stakes, 1st in Lingfield Derby Trial
 Supreme Leader – 3rd in 2,000 Guineas Stakes
 Theatrical – 1st in Ballysax Stakes, 1st in Derrinstown Stud Derby Trial

Subsequent Group 1 wins
Group 1 / Grade I victories after running in the Derby.

 Petoski – King George VI and Queen Elizabeth Stakes (1985)
 Law Society – Irish Derby (1985)
 Theatrical – Hialeah Turf Cup Handicap (1987), Man o' War Stakes (1987), Turf Classic Invitational Stakes (1987), Breeders' Cup Turf (1987)

Subsequent breeding careers
Leading progeny of participants in the 1985 Epsom Derby.

Sires of Classic winners
Slip Anchor (1st)
 User Friendly – 1st Epsom Oaks, 1st Irish Oaks, 1st St Leger Stakes (1992)
 Morshdi – 1st Derby Italiano (2001)
 Stowaway – 1st Great Voltigeur Stakes (1997)
 Posidonas – 1st Gran Premio d'Italia (1995)
Theatrical (7th)
 Zagreb – 1st Irish Derby (1996)
 Madeline's Dream – 1st Poule d'Essai des Pouliches (1993)
 Royal Anthem – 1st International Stakes (1999)
 Stage Affair – 2nd Irish Champion Hurdle (2000)
Shadeed (13th)
 Shadayid – 1st 1000 Guineas Stakes (1991)
 Sayyedati – 1st 1000 Guineas Stakes (1993) 
 Alydeed – 1st Queen's Plate (1992), 2nd Preakness Stakes (1992)
 Citadeed – 3rd Belmont Stakes (1995)
Damister (3rd)
 Celtic Swing – 1st Prix du Jockey Club (1995)
 Trot Star – 1st Sprinters Stakes (2001)
 Pennyweight Point – 3rd Fruit 'n' Veg Stakes (1998)
 In the Saltmine – Dam of Jazz Messenger

Sires of Group/Grade One winners
Law Society (2nd) – Damsire of five classic winners – Scorpion, Love Divine, Manhattan Cafe, Moonstone and Brametot
 Anzillero – 1st Deutschland-Preis (2001)
 Court Of Honour – 1st Gran Premio del Jockey Club (1995)
 Homme de Loi – 1st Grand Prix de Paris (1992)
 Catch Me – 1st Hatton's Grace Hurdle (2008)
Lanfranco (5th)
 Ligeiro – 1st Auckland Cup (1993)
 Super Franky – 1st Munster National (2000)

Sires of National Hunt horses
Supreme Leader (4th)
 Rule Supreme – 1st Grande Course de Haies d'Auteuil (2004), 1st Hennessy Cognac Gold Cup (2005)
 Keen Leader – 1st Tommy Whittle Chase (2003)
 Fundamentalist – 1st Royal & SunAlliance Novices' Hurdle (2004)
 Snob's Supreme – dam of Macs Joy
Phardante (8th)
 Bog Frog – 1st Grande Course de Haies d'Auteuil (1997)
 Truckers Tavern – 2nd Cheltenham Gold Cup (2003)
 Hanakham – 1st Royal Sun Alliance Chase (1997)
 La Noire – dam of Jezki, Jetson, Jett, Jered and Jenari

Other stallions
Petoski (11th) – Night Petticoat (1st Preis der Diana 1996 – dam of Next Desert and Next Gina), Mouseski (12 wins over jumps)Reach (6th) – Minor flat and jumps winners – later exported to JapanSeurat (12th) – Minor flat and jumps winners in FranceRoyal Harmony (9th) – Exported to Brazil

References

External links
 Colour Chart – Derby 1985

Epsom Derby
Epsom Derby
Epsom Derby
Epsom Derby
 1985
20th century in Surrey